Louis J. Horvitz is an American television director and producer. He has directed award ceremonies, such as the Academy Awards, Primetime Emmy Awards (winning seven and having twenty-one nominations), The Grammy Awards, Golden Globe Awards, AFI Life Achievement Award, and The Kennedy Center Honors. Horvitz is a graduate of the University of California, Los Angeles.

References

External links

1946 births
Living people
Film directors from Los Angeles
Film producers from California
Television producers from California
Place of birth missing (living people)
American television directors
Primetime Emmy Award winners
UCLA Film School alumni